River Kafu is a river in Uganda, in East Africa. On some older maps, the river is labelled as River Kabi.

Location
The Kafu River is located in the western part of Uganda.

The source of River Kafu is located near Kitoma, with coordinates: Latitude:1.1500;  Longitude:31.0820. River Kafu enters the Victoria Nile near Masindi Port, with coordinates: Latitude:1.6475; Longitude:32.0945. On its course eastwards, northeastwards and northwards, the river traverses or forms the borders of the following districts : Kibaale District, Hoima District, Kyankwanzi District, Nakaseke District, Nakasongola District and Masindi District.

Overview
The swamp, out of which River Kafu arises, is also transversed by another river system called River Nkusi. River Nkusi however, arises elsewhere and passes through the said swamp and flows westwards to empty into Lake Albert, along the International border between Uganda and the Democratic Republic of the Congo.

External links
Rivers and Lakes of Uganda

See also
Lake Albert
Victoria Nile
Masindi Port

References

Kafu
Kibaale District
Hoima District
Kyankwanzi District
Nakaseke District
Nakasongola District
Masindi District